Samuel Riley Sells (August 2, 1871 – November 2, 1935) was an American politician and a member of the United States House of Representatives for the 1st congressional district of Tennessee.

Biography
Sells was born on August 2, 1871 in Bristol, Tennessee in Sullivan County son of George Washington and Mary Margaret McCrary. He attended the rural schools and King College in Bristol, Tennessee from 1895 to 1890. He studied law, was admitted to the bar, and commenced practice in Blountville, Tennessee. He served as a private in Company F, Third Regiment, Tennessee Volunteer Infantry during the Spanish–American War. He married Frances Rice Hayward on April 25, 1904, and they had four children, Samuel Hayward, Charlotte Wyman, Lucy McGuire, and Frank Hayward.

Career
After moving to Johnson City, Tennessee, Sells engaged in the lumber business. He served as a member of the Tennessee Senate from 1909 to 1911.

Sells was elected as a Republican to the Sixty-second and to the four succeeding Congresses. He served from March 4, 1911 to March 3, 1921, and was an unsuccessful candidate for renomination in 1920. During the Sixty-sixth Congress, he was the chairman of the United States House Committee on Pensions. He was a delegate to the Republican National Convention in 1912, 1916 and 1932.

Resuming the lumber business in Johnson City, Tennessee, Sells also engaged in the manufacturing of shale brick and in numerous other enterprises.

Death
Sells died in Johnson City, Tennessee on November 2, 1935 (age 64 years, 92 days). He is interred at Oak Hill Cemetery in Johnson City.

References

External links

 

1871 births
1935 deaths
Republican Party Tennessee state senators
Republican Party members of the United States House of Representatives from Tennessee
People from Bristol, Tennessee
People from Johnson City, Tennessee